John I (died on 24 March 1386) was a member of the House of Auvergne who reigned as Count of Auvergne and Count of Boulogne from 1361 until his death. He was the eldest son of Robert VII, Count of Auvergne and Boulogne, by his second wife, Marie of the House of Dampierre. Auvergne and Boulogne were inherited by John's elder half-brother, William XII, passing to William's only child, Joan I, and then to her only child, Philip II. When the adolescent Count Philip died following a riding accident, the counties passed to John I, his granduncle. 

John I had two children by his wife, Joan of the House of Clermont, whom he married in 1328. A daughter named Marie married Raymond VII, Viscount of Turenne, while a son and namesake, John II, succeeded to the counties of Auvergne and Boulogne.

Counts of Boulogne
1386 deaths